Erigeron mancus  is a rare North American species of flowering plant in the family Asteraceae known by the common names depauperate fleabane and imperfect fleabane. It has been found only in southeastern Utah.

Erigeron mancus  is a short perennial herb rarely more than 7 centimeters (2.8 inches) tall, producing a woody taproot. The leaves are pinnately lobed near the bottom of the plant but not farther up the stem. The plant generally produces only 1 flower heads per stem, each head with several yellow disc florets but no ray florets. The species grows in alpine meadows, ridge tops, and rocky slopes at high elevation in the mountains.

References

Flora of Utah
mancus
Plants described in 1917
Flora without expected TNC conservation status